Passalus interruptus is a beetle of the Family Passalidae.

Description
The females are smaller than the males. Body is elongated, almost cylindrically shaped and completely black, head has a crooked horn between the eyes and mandibles show three teeth at the extremity and one in the middle. The lower jaw is very strong. Elytra are deeply furrowed. This beetle  feeds on tree sap.

Distribution and habitat
This species can be found in Panama and French Guiana. It prefers mixed deciduous forests.

References
 Biolib
 Hallan, Joel  Synopsis of the described Coleoptera of the World
 Sir John Richardson,William Swainson,William Kirby   Fauna Boreali-americana
 Tierdoku.com

External links

Passalidae
Beetles of North America
Beetles of South America
Beetles of Central America
Beetles described in 1758
Taxa named by Carl Linnaeus